Khaltmaagiin Battulga (also referred to as Battulga Khaltmaa; born 3 March 1963) is a Mongolian politician and sambo wrestler who served as the 5th President of Mongolia from 2017 to 2021. He served as Member of the State Great Khural from 2004 to 2016 and Minister of Roads, Transportation, Construction and Urban Development from 2008 to 2012. Before his career in politics, Battulga was a sambo wrestling champion. He was the Democratic Party's candidate in the 2017 presidential election and was elected President with 50.6% in the run-off, the first-ever run-off election in modern Mongolian history. Mongolians are sharply divided about his role in the 2019 Mongolian constitutional crisis.

Background
Battulga was born on March 3, 1963, in Ulaanbaatar. Battulga is a second child of three children. His father and mother are both from Bayankhongor Province. The family was allocated a traditional ger in the Yarmag district in Ulaanbaatar after they lost everything in the flood of Tuul River in 1966. In 1978, he graduated from the 10-year 34th secondary school in Ulaanbaatar. In 1982 he graduated from the School of Fine Arts of Mongolia with a degree in painting. While studying at the arts school, Battulga sold his paintings to tourists around the Bayangol Hotel area.

Business 
In 1990, Battulga started sewing and selling jeans locally and in Hungary. He saved $600 to buy a video camera and start an export-import business trading electronics from Singapore to Mongolia, Russia, and Eastern Europe.

Battulga was fascinated with The Godfather and named his first company Genco, the name of the olive oil importing company in the film. Genco acquired controlling interests during the privatization of state-owned assets such as Bayangol Hotel and meat-processing factory Makh-Impex in 1997 and 1999 respectively.

Wrestling 
Battulga grew up around Mongolian traditional wrestling, as his father Khaltmaa was a coach. Battulga was a member of the Mongolian National wrestling team from 1983-1990 and won the world cup championship in Ulaanbaatar in 1989. Battulga was awarded a Merited Sportsmen of Mongolia in 1995 before being selected as the Chairman of the Mongolian Judo Federation in 2006. Under Battulga's leadership at the Judo Federation, Mongolian judokas became Olympic champions for the first time in history.

Political activity

In 2004, Battulga became a Member of Parliament for Bayankhongor province for the first time. He was re-elected to parliament in 2008 and 2012. From 2008 to 2012, he was Minister of Roads and Transport of Mongolia. In 2012, he was appointed to the post of Minister of Industry and Agriculture of Mongolia.

Election 
Presidential elections were held on 26 June 2017. Incumbent President Tsakhiagiin Elbegdorj was constitutionally barred from running for a third term.  Battulga ran in the election representing the Democratic Party. He ran against former Prime Minister Miyeegombyn Enkhbold of the Mongolian People's Party. For the first time, no candidate received a majority of the vote in the first round, forcing a run-off between Battulga and Enkhbold on 7 July, brought forward from 9 July.  In the second round, Battulga was narrowly elected with 50.61% of the popular vote.

Presidency (2017–2021)

Inauguration
Battulga's inauguration took place at the State Palace on 10 July 2017 in the presence of Prime Minister Jargaltulgyn Erdenebat and former president Elbegdorj. In his presidential address, he laid out the principles for his term, including one for the industrialization of the country. He also said that he would work to maintain and expand the good-neighbor relations with Russia and China and will "pay utmost attention" to the third neighbor policy, referring to the United States. After the ceremony, he went outside to lay wreaths at the monuments to Damdin Sükhbaatar and Chinggis Khaan. He also received state heraldry, including the state stamp and the presidential certificate.

Since he became president, Battulga has made it standard practice for people to put their hand on their heart during the performance of the national anthem of Mongolia by a concert or military band, as well as a vocal performance.

Domestic policy

Death penalty

Within days of his inauguration, he took measures to reinstate the death penalty for sexual offenders, which came days after the death penalty was completely abolished in the country. On 16 October, Battulga announced the formation of an expert group to look into the reinstatement of the death penalty for premeditated murder and rape. The following month, he submitted his proposal to the justice and interior ministry. In a speech to the during the opening of the autumn session of the State Great Khural, he claimed that a systemic social crisis is to blame for the national challenges that posed a threat to the country.

Constitutional crisis 
On 27 March 2019, the State Great Khural began a constitutional crisis when it adopted an unprecedented law that gave the National Security Council of Mongolia the power to recommend the dismissal of judges and prosecutors, as well as the head of the national anti-corruption service. Battulga's political party, the opposition's main minority faction in the parliament, claims that the law undermines the country's constitutional separation of powers and the larger Mongolian democratic system.

Disbandment of the MPP 
In April 2021, Battulga issued an emergency directive to disband the MPP "in order to safeguard the sovereignty and democracy of the country" after the MPP passed amendments to the constitution. The constitutional amendments, which took effect in May 2020, limits one's presidency to one term, making Battulga ineligible to re-run in the 2021 presidential election. At the same time, he also condemned the formation of a  “Mongolian Military Union” as 'a parallel military structure" that "threatens the country's democratic foundations" and "endangers the fundamental rights and interests of our citizens and constitution." Luvsanvandangiin Bold, former Minister of Defense and current Battulga's Advisor on National Security warned that the creation of the union "will lead to the creation of quasi-fascist regime.”

Foreign policy

East Asia 
Battulga is largely seen as a pro-Russian politician and a Russophile due to his Russian ties and his knowledge of the Russian language. He is commonly compared to Russian President Vladimir Putin due to their shared love and experience in judo. When he spoke to Putin during a summit in eastern Russia in September 2017, Putin said that the shared sport will help "develop a good working and personal relationship".

Battulga has in recent years criticized the Mongolian economy's dependence on China.

On 14 June 2018, after the conclusion of the Singapore Summit between North Korean leader Kim Jong Un and U.S. President Donald Trump, Battulga congratulated both leaders, telling Kim that he considers the summit as a "landmark event not only for the North Korea–United States relations but for the Northeast Asian region and the Korean Peninsula". Battulga was widely expected to host the summit as the Mongolian head of state due to the fact that the country has sponsored many regional summits in recent years and is easily accessible by train from Pyongyang, North Korea. Days after the summit, Battulga invited Kim to Ulan Bator for a state visit in honor of the 70th anniversary of diplomatic relations.

Others
In mid-March 2018, Battulga appealed to U.S. President Trump via telegram to more trade relations, saying an economic downturn threatened to destabilize Mongolia, and that although Mongolia is an "oasis of democracy", this "does not contribute to economic development" in a region where authoritarianism (China and Russia) is on the rise. The United States is one of Mongolia’s so-called Third Neighbors, which Battulga said that U.S. trade and investment could help prevent the return of authoritarian in Mongolia. During a visit to Kyrgyzstan in June 2019, Battulga opened the Mongolian Embassy in Bishkek.

International trips as president

Private life
He currently lives with Angelique Davain, a Russian by nationality and native of the Khentii Province. His legal wife, Ts. Enkhtuya was the director of the Nüüdelchin Company. He is currently a father to two sets of twin sons and one daughter. Aside from Mongolian, Battulga speaks Russian and English.

John Bolton wrote in his book The Room Where It Happened that President Battulga's son served in Afghanistan for a US-led multinational force.

Residence 
In 2017, newly-elected Battulga has said that he intended to live in the "Winter Palace" in central Ulaanbaatar, also known as the Marshal’s Residence, in a departure from tradition. The two story-building was originally the residence of Marshal Khorloogiin Choibalsan. It is located in the heart of the capital between Peace Avenue and Seoul Street (next to the 1st School and the Russian Embassy). Being 400 meter from the State House he insisted to stay there so that he can walk to work.

Social contributions
Battulga sponsored the construction of the Chingis Khan Equestrian Statue near Ulaanbaatar to celebrate national pride. The statue became one of the main tourist attractions.

Battulga is also President of the Mongolian Judo Association. Under his guidance, Mongolian judoka Tuvshinbayar Naidan became an Olympic judo champion in Beijing 2008. As such, judo has become one of the most popular sports in Mongolia.

References

External links

1963 births
Democratic Party (Mongolia) politicians
Agriculture ministers of Mongolia
Industry ministers of Mongolia
Transport ministers of Mongolia
Living people
Mongolian artists
Mongolian businesspeople
Mongolian sambo practitioners
Mongolian male judoka
People from Ulaanbaatar
Presidents of Mongolia
20th-century Mongolian artists
21st-century Mongolian politicians